Nariman (also spelled Narriman, Nareeman, Neriman, Nəriman) is a name of Persian origin. It has roots traced to the Persian epic, Shahnameh, written by Ferdowsi.  The name can mean "faith and brightness".  It can also mean "brave, hero", with roots in the Avestan word naire-manå ("brave, manly").  In other countries, like Iran, it is used interchangeably with Nauroz, the Persian festival.  In Iran and Azerbaijan it is typically a male given name, whereas in Turkey and the Arab World it is commonly female.

People

Given name
Nariman Behravesh (born 1948), American economist
Nariman Farvardin (born 1956), American engineer
Nariman Narimanov (1870–1925), Azerbaijani statesman, revolutionary, and writer
Neriman Özsoy (born 1988), Turkish volleyball player
Narriman Sadek (1933–2005), the last Queen of Egypt
Nariman Youssef, Egyptian translator

Surname
Khurshed Nariman, Indian politician
Mansour Nariman (1935–2015), Iranian musician
Fali Nariman (born 1929), Indian jurist

Fictional characters
Nariman (father of Sām), character in Shahnameh
Narreeman, character in Flashman
 Nariman Hansotia, character in Squatter, a story in Tales from Firozsha Baag by Rohinton Mistry

Places
Nariman, Ardabil, Iran
Nariman, Lorestan, Iran
Nariman, Zanjan, Iran
Nariman, Kyrgyzstan
Nariman, Republic of Dagestan, Russia
Nariman Point, Mumbai, India
Narimanovo Airport, Astrakhan, Russia
Nərimanov raion, Baku, Azerbaijan
Nərimanov, Azerbaijan

Other uses
Nariman (film), a 2001 Indian Malayalam action/investigative thriller

See also
Nərimanabad (disambiguation), various places in Azerbaijan
Nərimanlı (disambiguation), various places in Azerbaijan
Nərimankənd (disambiguation), various places in Azerbaijan

Iranian-language surnames
Persian masculine given names
Turkish feminine given names